Latif Shandal (born 1 July 1938) is a former Iraqi football goalkeeper who played for Iraq between 1964 and 1968. He played in the 1964 Arab Nations Cup.

References

Iraqi footballers
Iraq international footballers
Living people
Association football goalkeepers
1938 births